"Flyswatter" is a single by the American rock band, Eels. It was  the second single from their 2000 album, Daisies of the Galaxy, and reached number 55 on the UK Singles Chart. It was later covered by indie pop trio Smoosh.

Track listing
CD one
"Flyswatter" (E) – 3:17
"Something Is Sacred" (E) – 2:52
"Vice President Fruitley" (Butch, E, and Lisa Germano) – 2:14

CD two
"Flyswatter" – 3:17
"Open the Door" (Live from the BBC) (Linda Hopper and Ruthie Morris) – 3:03
"Flyswatter" (Polka Dots Remix) (E) – 2:28

European CD (SKG Music LLC | 450 940-2)
"Flyswatter" – 3:17
"Open the Door" (Live from the BBC) (Linda Hopper and Ruthie Morris) – 3:03
"Vice President Fruitley" (Butch, E, and Lisa Germano) – 2:14
"Flyswatter" (Polka Dots Remix) (E) – 2:28

7"
Side A: "Flyswatter" (E) – 3:17
Side B: "Vice President Fruitley" (Butch, E, and Germano) – 2:14

References

External links
 
 

2000 singles
Eels (band) songs
Songs written by Mark Oliver Everett
Song recordings produced by Mark Oliver Everett
1999 songs
DreamWorks Records singles